China v Hong Kong was a 1986 FIFA World Cup qualification match played on 19 May 1985, noteworthy in that the surprise result caused deep dissatisfaction and hooliganism among Mainland Chinese football fans, leading to the match being immortalised as the 19 May Incident or 5.19 incident. 

Needing a victory to advance, Hong Kong achieved a stunning 2–1 win to eliminate heavily-favoured China, with goals from Cheung Chi Tak in the 19th minute and Ku Kam Fai in the 60th minute. Indian referee Melvyn D'Souza officiated the match, which was described by commentators at the time as being played in an unusually intense (for an Asian World Cup qualifier) manner. After the loss, disgruntled home fans rioted in the Workers' Stadium and the People's Armed Police were needed to restore order. Due to the high stakes, the match was one of the most notable in the rivalry between the China and Hong Kong national football teams.

Background

China were the runners-up of the 1984 AFC Asian Cup and expected to be by far the strongest team in its 1986 FIFA World Cup qualification AFC Zone B first round group. China and Hong Kong had met earlier in the tournament, playing out a scoreless draw in Hong Kong. They entered the final match tied on points; however, China held the advantage in goal differential due to larger margins of victory over the group's other two teams, Brunei and Macau. Thus, in order to advance to the next round, Hong Kong would need an unlikely away win in the Chinese capital.

Table before the match

After 12 May 1985, the group 4A table was as follows:

China qualifies for second round with win or draw.

Hong Kong qualifies for second round with win only.

Match

Summary
Under the glare of the floodlights and the noise of 80,000 fans at the Workers' Stadium in Beijing, the Chinese team began the game on the offensive, determined to achieve a win rather than a draw and finally qualify in dominant fashion. However, while the hosts came up empty initially, it was Hong Kong who struck the first surprising blow in the 19th minute.  During a free kick, Wu Kwok Hung back-heeled the ball stealthily behind him to defender Cheung Chi Tak, who from well outside the penalty box blasted a thunderous shot past Chinese goalkeeper Lu Jianren into the upper corner, making the score 1–0 in favor of the visitors. Undeterred, China increased pressure, and equalized twelve minutes later when Li Hui scored on a rebound after Hong Kong's keeper Chan Wan Ngok could not secure an initial shot. However, the Chinese players surprisingly went on the attack again in the second half, allowing more offensive chances for the Hong Kong side, culminating when Ku Kam Fai scored a rebound attempt of his own to put Hong Kong in the lead again after 60 minutes. Over the final half-hour of play, China fired several shots on goal in a desperate scramble for an equalizer, but it never came and Hong Kong left the pitch with a historic 2-1 victory.

Details

Aftermath

Result

Hong Kong advances to Zone B Second Round.

In the AFC Zone B Second Round (AFC semifinals), Hong Kong faced another heavy favorite in a two-legged matchup with Japan.  They quickly allowed two goals in the first leg in Japan, eventually falling 3–0.  They performed better in the second leg at home, but missed a penalty and lost 2–1. Japan advanced to the Zone B Final Round, 5–1 on aggregate score.

For China, the result represented another frustrating setback in their quest to qualify for their first World Cup finals. In the qualifying tournament for the 1982 edition, they had lost to New Zealand by the same score in a winner-take-all match to qualify for the World Cup Finals.  It would not be until 2002 that China would finally qualify for their first FIFA World Cup.

Hooliganism incident
This match also led to "the first incident of football hooliganism in the history of the People's Republic of China". While Hong Kong's team received a hero's welcome upon their return, disgruntled mainland Chinese fans rioted in and around Workers Stadium after the match, and the People's Armed Police were needed to restore order. 127 people were arrested in total. Zeng Xuelin, manager of the Chinese national team, and Li Fenglou, chairman of the Chinese Football Association, both resigned after the incident.

References

  资料：中国足球“519惨案”
 Database

China national football team matches
Hong Kong national football team matches
1984–85 in Hong Kong football
1985 in Chinese football
Riots and civil disorder in China
Association football riots
Association football hooliganism
Association football controversies
1986 FIFA World Cup qualification (AFC)
FIFA World Cup qualification matches
May 1985 sports events in Asia
1985